This list is about the meanings of the letters used in mathematics, science and engineering. SI units are indicated in parentheses.  For the Unicode blocksee Mathematical Alphanumeric Symbols.

Latin and Greek letters are used in mathematics, science, engineering, and other areas where mathematical notation is used as symbols for constants, special functions, and also conventionally for variables representing certain quantities.

Some common conventions:
 Intensive quantities in physics are usually denoted with minusculeswhile extensive are denoted with capital letters.
 Most symbols are written in italics.
 Vectors can be denoted in boldface. 
 Sets of numbers are typically bold or blackboard bold.

Latin

Greek

More

See also

 Blackboard bold letters used in mathematics
 Greek letters used in mathematics, science, and engineering
 Latin letters used in mathematics

Mathematics-related lists
Physics-related lists